Morrison High School may refer to:

Morrison Glace Bay High School, Nova Scotia, Canada
Morrison High School (Illinois), Morrison, Illinois
Morrison High School (Oklahoma), Morrison, Oklahoma